Renato Soru (born 6 August 1957) is an Italian politician and entrepreneur. He is the founder of the internet service company Tiscali, based in Cagliari. Forbes listed Soru as one of the world's richest people, with a net worth of over $4 billion (US) as of September 2001.

Early life and career
Soru was born in Sanluri, Sardinia, in 1957. He holds a University degree from the Bocconi University in Milan.

In 2004, Soru was elected the president of Sardinia with the centre-left coalition with an audacious program to reinvigorate the economy within the island by introducing external investors. On 28 November 2008, he resigned from his position. He ran again for president of Sardinia in the February 2009 election but was defeated by the right-wing Popolo della Libertà candidate Ugo Cappellacci.

On 20 May 2008, Soru bought the left-wing newspaper l'Unità.

Controversies
On 5 May 2016, Soru was sentenced to three years in prison for tax evasion that amounted to about 2.6 million euro and was connected to a loan made by the company Andalas Ldt to Tiscali. The sentence was reversed by the Italian court of appeal on 8 May 2017. Out of five counts, he was cleared from the third "because the fact is not a crime" and from the two "because the fact did not happen".

References

External links
 Bernhard, Marcella, "Forbes Faces: Renato Soru", Forbes, 1 Oktober 2001
Forbes listing from "World's Richest People" (archived 2011)
 

1957 births
Living people
Presidents of Sardinia
Bocconi University alumni
Italian mass media owners
Internet company founders
Italian newspaper publishers (people)
Italian billionaires
People from the Province of South Sardinia
MEPs for Italy 2014–2019
21st-century Italian politicians
Soru
21st-century Italian criminals
Italian people convicted of tax crimes
Italian politicians convicted of crimes
Heads of government who were later imprisoned